The 2018–19 Gambian Premier League is the 50th season of the GFA League First Division, the top-tier football league in Gambia. The season started on 24 November 2018 and ended on 9 June 2019.

Standings
Final table.

References

GFA League First Division seasons
Premier League
Premier League
Gambia